Roderick Granville 'Rod' Bransgrove (born 1950) is an English entrepreneur, cricket administrator and the current chairman of Hampshire County Cricket Club. A position he has held since being elected to the post in 2000, a move seen by many as saving Hampshire from insolvency. His daughter, Lucy, is married to the Hampshire cricketer, Chris Wood.

Personal life
Bransgrove's father served in the Royal Air Force, meaning he was brought up in a number of places, including abroad in Singapore and at home in London and Kent.

Business career
Bransgrove moved to Hampshire in 1985, when he was 35, to set up his pharmaceutical business, Imperial Pharmaceuticals Services. In 1995 it was merged into Shire Pharmaceuticals Group plc with Rod a non-executive Director of Shire 1995 to 1998.

Hampshire cricket

Music career
Bransgrove (as Bestie Rote) features in Southampton-based six-strong soft rock band, Strapped for Cash, which released a Christmas single for four charities including Children in Need, in 2013. In 2014 the band released a debut EP, Kick Me When I'm Down, and played at the Ageas Bowl and in July 2015 will support Eric Clapton at a charity gig in Wormsley.

References

1950 births 
Living people 
English businesspeople
English cricket administrators
Hampshire County Cricket Club